Manchester Township may refer to:

United Kingdom
 Manchester (ancient township), in England

United States
 Manchester Township, Dallas County, Arkansas, in Dallas County, Arkansas
 Manchester Township, Boone County, Illinois
 Manchester Township, Dearborn County, Indiana
 Manchester Township, Michigan
 Manchester Township, Freeborn County, Minnesota
 Manchester Township, New Jersey, in Ocean County
 Manchester Township, Passaic County, New Jersey
 Manchester Township, Cumberland County, North Carolina
 Manchester Township, Adams County, Ohio
 Manchester Township, Morgan County, Ohio
 Manchester Township, York County, Pennsylvania
 Manchester Township, Wayne County, Pennsylvania
 Manchester Township, Kingsbury County, South Dakota, in Kingsbury County, South Dakota

Township name disambiguation pages